Komarnica is a geographic name that may refer to:

, a river in northern Montenegro
Komarnica, Cerkvenjak, a village in the Municipality of Cerkvenjak, northeastern Slovenia
Komarnica, Šavnik, a village in the Municipality of Šavnik, central Montenegro
Komarnica, Staro Petrovo Selo, a village in the Municipality of Staro Petrovo Selo, eastern Croatia